Dieter Bouvry (born 31 July 1992) is a Belgian former professional racing cyclist. He rode at the 2013 UCI Road World Championships.

Major results

2009
 5th Omloop der Vlaamse Gewesten
 7th Overall Keizer der Juniores
2010
 3rd Grand Prix Bati-Metallo
 3rd Overall Keizer der Juniores
 8th Overall Regio-Tour
 10th Paris–Roubaix Juniors
2012
 4th Liège–Bastogne–Liège U23
 10th Grand Prix des Marbriers
2013
 5th Overall Czech Cycling Tour
 6th Overall Volta ao Alentejo
 6th Kattekoers
 6th Puchar Uzdrowisk Karpackich
 7th Overall Course de Solidarność et des Champions Olympiques
2015
 9th Gooikse Pijl
2016
 1st Paris–Chauny
 5th Overall Ronde de l'Oise
2017
 1st Overall Tour de Cote d'Ivoire

References

External links

1992 births
Living people
Belgian male cyclists
People from Roeselare
21st-century Belgian people